Extended Play is an extended play and the debut release by English industrial band Cabaret Voltaire. It was released in November 1978, through record label Rough Trade.

Track listing

Personnel 
 Cabaret Voltaire

 Richard H. Kirk – guitar, vocals, production, recording, sleeve design
 Stephen Mallinder – bass guitar, vocals, production, recording, sleeve design
 Chris Watson – keyboards, tape operation, vocals, production, recording, sleeve design

 Technical

 A Porky Prime Cut (Porky) – cutting
 Rod (Rod Siddall) – sleeve photography

Further reading

External links 
 

1978 debut EPs
Cabaret Voltaire (band) EPs
Rough Trade Records EPs
Industrial EPs